The Sanford-Wang parameterisation is an empirical formula used to model the production of pions in nuclear interaction of the form p+A → +X where a beam of high-energy protons hit a material.

Its formula for the double-differential cross section with respect to momentum (p) and solid angle is as follows.

The numbers  are the Sanford-Wang parameters and are typically varied to give a good fit with experimental data.

References 

 J. R. Sanford and C. L. Wang, Brookhaven National Laboratory, AGS internal report, 1967 (unpublished)
 
 

Quantum chromodynamics
Scattering
Experimental particle physics